Thīna (Sanskrit styāna|स्त्यान​) is a Buddhist term that is translated as "sloth". Thīna is defined as sluggishness or dullness of mind, characterized by a lack of driving power. In the Theravada tradition, thīna is said to occur in conjunction with middha (torpor), which is defined as a morbid state that is characterized by unwieldiness, lack of energy, and opposition to wholesome activity. The two mental factors in conjunction are expressed as thīna-middha (sloth-torpor).

Thīna is mentioned in the Pali canon as:
 One of the five hindrances to meditation practice (in combination with middha, i.e. as sloth-torpor)
 One of the fourteen unwholesome mental factors within the Theravada Abhidharma teachings
 Closely related to the Sanskrit term kausīdya (spiritual sloth), that is identified as one of the twenty secondary unwholesome factors within the Mahayana Abhidharma teachings

Explanation
Bhikkhu Bodhi explains:

The Atthasālinī (II, Book I, Part IX, Chapter II, 255) states about sloth and torpor: “Absence of striving, difficulty through inability, is the meaning.” We then read the following definitions of sloth and torpor:

Nina van Gorkom explains:

See also
 Kausīdya
 Mental factors (Buddhism)
 Moha (Buddhism)
 Middha

References

Sources
 Bhikkhu Bodhi (2003), A Comprehensive Manual of Abhidhamma, Pariyatti Publishing
 Nina van Gorkom (2010), Cetasikas, Zolag

External links
 

Unwholesome factors in Buddhism
Sanskrit words and phrases